Otakar Odložilík (January 12, 1899 – July 14, 1973) was a Czechoslovak historian and archivist who wrote numerous books and papers on the history of Protestantism in Bohemia and Moravia. His scholarly interests included the history of the Hussite movement and the Unity of the Brethren, and he published studies of Jan Milíč, Andrzej Rej and the history of Charles University in Prague.

He wrote the article on the history of Bohemia and Czechoslovakia for the 1974 edition of the Encyclopædia Britannica. Following World War II, he spent most of his life as a professor in the United States and taught at both the Columbia University and the University of Pennsylvania before his death.

References 

1899 births
1973 deaths
Czechoslovak historians
Czechoslovak academics
Columbia University faculty
University of Pennsylvania faculty
Czechoslovak emigrants to the United States